Michael Windischmann (born December 6, 1965, in Nuremberg, West Germany) is an American retired soccer defender who played in both the Major Indoor Soccer League and the American Soccer League.  He earned fifty caps with the U.S. national team and was the captain of the U.S. team at the 1990 FIFA World Cup.  He is a member of the National Soccer Hall of Fame.

Youth
Although born in Germany, Windischmann's family moved to the United States when he was an infant. He attended Thomas Edison High School in New York City.  He began playing soccer when he was six years old and developed as a player, not in the school system, but playing for local New York City clubs.  These included Blau-Weiss Gottschee, S.C. Gjoa and Queens United.  He played college soccer at Adelphi University.  In 1986, Adelphi University inducted Windischmann into the school's Athletic Hall of Fame.

Professional
After graduating from Adelphi University in 1986, Windischmann chose an alternate career from most of his peers. At the time, the Major Indoor Soccer League (MISL) was the destination of choice for collegiate soccer players. Windischmann decided instead to play for the Brooklyn Italians of New York City's Cosmopolitan League. He played two seasons with the Italians before joining the Los Angeles Lazers of MISL. His single season with the Lazers ran the 1988 to 1989 season when the team folded at the end of the season.  Windischmann then moved to the Albany Capitals of the American Soccer League for another single season. At the end of the 1990 season, Windischmann retired from professional soccer.

National team
Windischmann played for the U.S. at the U-16 World Cup.

Windischmann earned his first cap with the senior national team in 1984.  He also played for the U.S. at the 1985 World University Games.  Two years later, in 1987, he again played at the World University Games.  That year, he was also on the U.S. team at the 1987 Pan American Games.  The U.S. went 1-1-1 and did not make the second round.

The three years of 1988 to 1990 saw his international career reach its height.  It began with the 1988 Summer Olympics where Windischmann was a member of the U.S. team.  Windischmann considers one of his all-time career highlights, scoring a goal in a 1–1 tie with Argentina.  Despite this excellent result, the U.S. finished the first round at 1-1-1 and did not qualify for the second round.

Windischmann saw more personal success the next year when he was chosen as the 1989 U.S. Soccer Athlete of the Year.  He was also named as the captain for the 1990 FIFA World Cup qualification games.  Windischmann's greatest achievement came when he captained the U.S. team at the 1990 FIFA World Cup.  This was the first time the U.S. had made it to the World Cup since 1950.  By the time Windischmann retired in 1990, he held the national-team record for the most consecutive games played (36) and started (33).

Windischmann also played for the U.S. at the 1989 and 1992 FIFA Futsal World Championship which finished third and second respectively.  He earned 24 caps and scored 4 goals for the United States national futsal team between 1986 and 1992.

In 2004, he was elected to the National Soccer Hall of Fame.

Coaching
He currently teaches and coaches at the Susan B. Anthony Academy, New York.

References

External links
 
 USSoccerPlayers.com bio
 MISL stats
 

1965 births
Living people
1990 FIFA World Cup players
Adelphi University alumni
Adelphi Panthers men's soccer players
Albany Capitals players
American men's futsal players
American soccer players
American Professional Soccer League players
American Soccer League (1988–89) players
Blau-Weiss Gottschee players
Brooklyn Italians players
Footballers at the 1988 Summer Olympics
German emigrants to the United States
Footballers from Nuremberg
Los Angeles Lazers players
National Soccer Hall of Fame members
Major Indoor Soccer League (1978–1992) players
Olympic soccer players of the United States
Footballers at the 1987 Pan American Games
Pan American Games competitors for the United States
United States men's international soccer players
United States men's youth international soccer players
Association football defenders